Pope Alexander of Alexandria may refer to:

 Pope Alexander I of Alexandria, Patriarch of Alexandria in 313–326 or 328
 Pope Alexander II of Alexandria, ruled in 702–729